Mansalay, officially the Municipality of Mansalay,  is a 2nd class municipality in the province of Oriental Mindoro, Philippines. According to the 2020 census, it has a population of 59,114 people.

This town is notable for its indigenous Mangyan population. The municipal hall is located on the upper land of Mansalay Town proper, in front of a Medical Care Hospital. Nearby is the church and the only Catholic School, Mansalay Catholic High School. Santa Catalina is the town's patron saint.

The town also has a wide ammonite formation area discovered in the 1940s. Since then, thousands of ammonite fossils have been discovered. Due to the complexity and vastness of the collection found in the area, the town has been called the Ammonite Capital of the Philippines. Various local and international scientific institutions have conducted research on the ammonite formations of Mansalay. Scholars have argued that due to the natural significance of the area to Southeast Asian pre-history, the site has a big chance of being declared as a UNESCO World Heritage Site or a UNESCO Geopark Reserve.

Geography

Barangays
Mansalay is politically subdivided into 17 barangays. In 1957, the sitios of Santa Brigida, Santa Maria, Roma, Budburan, and Mahabangsapa were constituted into barrios.

Climate

Demographics

Economy

Its people relies heavily on fishing and farming to survive and earn a living. Because of meager income opportunities, Mansalay has produced a large number of overseas Filipino workers who send remittance back.

References

External links
Mansalay Profile at PhilAtlas.com
[ Philippine Standard Geographic Code]
Philippine Census Information
Local Governance Performance Management System
Mansalay Official Home Page

Municipalities of Oriental Mindoro